Löningen is a town in the district of Cloppenburg, in Lower Saxony, Germany. The town is situated on the river Hase, approx. 25 km southwest of Cloppenburg.

History
Löningen originally appeared in 822 as Loingo. The name Löningen was mentioned first in 1147 in a letter to the Bishop von Hildesheim, when the area of Löningen belonged to the Corvey Abbey. Beginning in 1200 Löningen belonged to the Count von Tecklenburg. The diocese Münster absorbed Löningen beginning in 1400.  In 1803, church rule ended and Löningen belonged to the Duchy of Oldenburg. From 1810 to 1813 Löningen belonged to the Arrondissement Quakenbrück. After the battle of Leipzig, Löningen returned to Oldenburg.

In 1814 the Duchy of Oldenburg was divided into 25 offices, one of which became Löningen. This was dissolved 1879 and Löningen was assigned to the district of Cloppenburg.

During the World War II, the first bombs in the Löningen area fell in 1940, and in 1945 the Löningen district courthouse was destroyed by bombing. On the 10th and 11 April 1945 British troops arrived and surrounded the German troops on three sides — after which the German troops retreated.

The municipal laws of Löningen were codified on 1 March 1982.

Population

Mayors 
1951–1952: Bernard Berges
1952–1960: Wilhelm Bischoff, (CDU)
1960–1972: Adolf Richard, (CDU)
1972–1986: Kurt Schmücker, (CDU)
1986–1991: Heinrich Wesselmann, (CDU)
1991–1997: Clemens Winkler, (CDU)
1997–2001: Hermann Vorholt, (CDU)
2001-2014: Thomas Städtler, Independent
2014–2021: Marcus Willen, (CDU)
since 2021: Burkhard Sibbel

Notable people 
 Kurt Schmücker (1919-1996), politician (CDU)
 Silvia Breher (born 1973), politician (CDU)
 Torge Hollmann (born 1982), football player
 Marco di Carli (born 1985), swimmer

References

Towns in Lower Saxony
Cloppenburg (district)